Tucker Carlson Tonight is an American talk show and current affairs program hosted by conservative commentator Tucker Carlson on the television network Fox News. The show premiered in November 2016 and includes political commentary, monologues, interviews, and analysis, similar to Fox News' On the Record.

Guest hosts for the program include Will Cain, Sean Duffy, Tulsi Gabbard and Brian Kilmeade.

Created to replace On the Record hosted by Brit Hume on an interim basis after Greta Van Susteren's departure from Fox News, the show premiered as a 7:00 PM ET program in Fox News Channel's lineup. The series currently airs at 8:00 PM ET, while reruns of each night's episode air at 1:00 AM ET the following morning.

History 
Following Megyn Kelly's departure from Fox News, the network announced on January 5, 2017, that Tucker Carlson Tonight would take over the 9:00 PM ET time slot vacated by The Kelly File beginning on January 9, 2017. Martha MacCallum was named as his replacement in the 7:00 PM timeslot, with her show carrying the title The First 100 Days.  On April 24, 2017, Tucker Carlson Tonight took over The O'Reilly Factors 8:00 PM time slot, following its cancellation.

In December 2019, Playboy model Karen McDougal sued Fox News after Carlson used his show to accuse her of extorting President Donald Trump. In September 2020, a federal judge dismissed the lawsuit, citing Fox News' defense that Carlson's extortion claims were opinion-based and not "statements of fact". The judge also agreed with Fox News' defense that reasonable viewers would have "skepticism" over statements Carlson makes on its show, as he often engages in 'exaggeration' and 'non-literal commentary'".

In July 2020, the show's head writer, Blake Neff, resigned after Oliver Darcy of CNN learned via an anonymous tip that he had authored a series of online comments that were widely regarded as racist and sexist. Neff posted these remarks over the span of several years under a pseudonym on AutoAdmit, a legal message board known for its lack of moderation. Neff, who previously worked at The Daily Caller, had joined the staff of the television show shortly after its launch in November 2016.

Format 

Carlson, who co-founded The Daily Caller with Neil Patel, typically devotes his show to two or three current events and brings on speakers to debate or discuss such topics. Carlson uses a loose format in which he interviews persons from varied political perspectives and asks them probing questions. The show is broadcast live at 8:00 PM ET on weeknights, with a repeat airing at 1:00 AM the following morning.

The show is typically begun with the introduction "Good evening, and welcome to Tucker Carlson Tonight." Carlson describes the program as "the show that is the sworn enemy of lying, pomposity, smugness, and groupthink," a catchphrase which he often uses as a closing.

Ratings 
The program's premiere episode garnered 3.7 million viewers and was rated higher than previous editions of On the Record hosted by Greta Van Susteren and later Brit Hume. Tucker Carlson Tonight currently maintains the network's time-slot dominance over CNN's Anderson Cooper 360° and MSNBC's All In with Chris Hayes.

In October 2018, Tucker Carlson Tonight was the second-highest rated news show in all of prime time, after Hannity, with 3.2 million nightly viewers. In April 2020, Carlson's program surpassed Hannity as the highest-rated primetime cable news show, with an average audience of 4.56 million viewers. During the second quarter of 2020, Tucker Carlson Tonight garnered an average audience of 4.33 million viewers, the largest for any program in the history of cable news.

In July 2020, Tucker Carlson Tonight broke the record for highest-rated program in U.S. cable news history, garnering an average nightly audience of 4.33 million viewers.

In February 2022, Mediaite reported that "in the month of October, Tucker Carlson [was] the number-one watched host among Democrats in the key 25-54 age demographic – across all networks."

Reactions 
In 2018, neoconservative pundit Bill Kristol (former editor-at-large of The Weekly Standard and current editor-at-large of The Bulwark) described the views Carlson expressed on his show as "ethno-nationalism of some kind." Carlson responded that Kristol "discredited himself years ago."

Throughout 2018 and 2019, the show was the target of an advertiser boycott. Advertisers began leaving the show after complaints following Carlson saying that U.S. immigration made the country "poorer, dirtier and more divided." According to Fox News, the advertisers only moved their ad buys to other segments. By early 2019, it was reported the show had lost at least 26 advertisers, and by August 2019, Media Matters calculated that the show had lost more than 70 advertisers since December 2018. By late September 2019, almost 50 advertisers had released statements announcing the discontinuation of advertising on the show; according to The Guardian, "dozens more cut ties without saying anything publicly." Despite these boycotts, the average cost for a 30-second spot on Tucker Carlson Tonight nearly doubled from 2018 to 2019, according to the advertising analytics company SQAD.

In a September 2018 episode of Tucker Carlson Tonight, Carlson coined the nickname "creepy porn lawyer" to refer to Michael Avenatti, ostensibly in reference to the latter's representing Stormy Daniels, which Avenatti objected to and reportedly found infuriating. Following on and off-air sparring between Tucker Carlson and Michael Avenatti, Avenatti announced that he was investigating an alleged bar altercation involving Tucker Carlson and a patron. This culminated in the revelation that Carlson had thrown a glass of wine at a man who had insulted his daughter. A July 2019 book by author Peter D'Abrosca made reference to the incident.

In opposition to many Fox colleagues, in January 2020, Carlson criticized the assassination of Qasem Soleimani by the Trump administration.

In June 2020, Carlson's on-air criticisms of the Black Lives Matter movement led corporations such as The Walt Disney Company, T-Mobile, Papa John's, and Poshmark to pull advertising from his program. A data firm estimated that nearly 38% of Carlson's 2020 advertising revenue had come from My Pillow at half-year. Carlson remained the most-watched cable news host, garnering 680,000 viewers among audience members 25-54. These advertisers had not entirely pulled away from Fox News, according to the television network, but only from Carlson's show.

In July 2020, after combat veteran Senator Tammy Duckworth called for a "national dialogue" about the removal of monuments to founding fathers such as George Washington who owned slaves, Carlson received backlash after referring to her as a "moron" and, after she refused to appear on his show absent an apology, a "coward." Carlson's comment that "she was once injured while serving in the Illinois National Guard" was criticized, and he was accused of trivializing her military service; Duckworth in fact lost both her legs while serving in Iraq.

On November 12, 2020, the show broadcast a segment about alleged voter fraud in Georgia during the 2020 presidential election. The piece featured the story of a World War II veteran named James Blalock of Covington, Georgia, who died in 2006; Carlson stated on air that "James Blalock cast a ballot in last week's election." Reporting by local news outlets in Georgia later confirmed that Mr. Blalock did not vote in the 2020 election, but that his widow had cast a legal vote under the name "Mrs. James E. Blalock, Jr"; this was confirmed by interviews with Blalock's widow herself. A day later, Carlson issued an on-air correction, stating that "we're always going to correct when we're wrong."

Later that month, Carlson criticized unfounded claims made by former federal prosecutor Sidney Powell, who alleged that Venezuela, Cuba and unidentified communist interests had used a secret algorithm to hack into voting machines and commit electoral fraud in the 2020 election. Carlson noted that "what Powell was describing would amount to the single greatest crime in American history", and claimed Powell became "angry and told us to stop contacting her" when he asked for evidence of such fraud. In response, James Golden, producer of The Rush Limbaugh Show, tweeted: "How quickly we turn on our own... Where is the 'evidence' the election was fair?".

In March 2022, during the Russian invasion of Ukraine, Los Angeles Times opinion columnist Jackie Calmes criticized Carlson for his coverage of the invasion which she considered to be biased in favor of Vladimir Putin and the Kremlin.

References

External links
 Official website

2010s American television news shows
2016 American television series debuts
Current affairs shows
English-language television shows
Fox News original programming
Conservative media in the United States
2020s American television news shows